KTCV (88.1 FM) is a high school radio station broadcasting an Alternative music music format. Licensed to Kennewick, Washington, United States, the radio station is currently owned by the Kennewick School District. It broadcasts from the Tri-Tech Skills Center in Kennewick, by students as part of extra classes taken by Juniors and Seniors from high schools in the Tri-City area.

History

Originally supervised by Marv Carstens, the station's early years included great friction with some elements of the community over the all heavy metal format. The station was shut down for a time due to complaints from Evangelicals. It was reborn in the late 1980s as a billboard top 40 station. Broadcast hours were severely curtailed during this time frame; sign off was at 5:00pm. The Top 40 format was never embraced within the station and did not succeed. The early 1990s brought a first for the Tri-Cities: a classic rock format. The station shifted away from the unpopular top 40 format and during class hours ran the classic rock format.  After class hours, students ran special programs from 3:00pm to 5:00pm sign off. Also during this time, as a test, Tri-Tech's administration loosened up on the station and allowed Friday night KTCV to broadcast until 10:00pm.

The classic rock format was phased out after country KOTY 106.5 became KEGX 'The Eagle 106.5" in 1993 with its own classic rock format. KTCV then shifted to more of an underground rock format. New slogan was "88.1 The Alternative." That branding existed until the late 2000s with the station rebranding as "88.1 The Edge."

Today, local radio veteran Ed Dailey has taught the program since 1997. The station has broadcast 24/7 since the early 2000s with the addition of an automation system. Unlike the early days when KTCV always had a live DJ, today KTCV reflects the industry standard and operates primarily with automation and voice tracking.

Mid-1990s Crises

The 1990s brought a few crises to the station. The most serious, was a challenge to the license in 1996 by two outside groups. At the time, KTCV was running severely restricted hours again due to internal problems. The outside groups attempted to force a shared frequency agreement with the Kennewick School District. This would've set the stage for the Kennewick School District to completely lose the station. However, some decisive actions were enacted by the Tri-Tech administration and the license was saved.

Additionally, the station's license accidentally expired during this era without a proper renewal forcing the station to go off the air. Through luck and immediate action, the FCC allowed the station an emergency renewal.

Another event that forced the station to go off the air was an incident with an outdated EAS relay system. KTCV stayed off the air until the system was updated.

As KTCV has entered the 21st century, stability has been the rule. The station has been well cared for by Mr. Dailey and the Tri-Tech administration.

Coverage

KTCV has gone through various signal upgrades over the years. Originally, with an ERP of 320 watts that covered Kennewick well, but listeners in West Richland and especially Benton City had a difficult time receiving the station. Power was increased in the late 1990s to 1100. Today, the current ERP of the station is 3500 watts. The current signal now does well for the most part in the greater Tri-City area. Benton City continues to have reception problems in some places due to geography.

Reception of KTCV is no longer possible in Walla Walla due to K-LOVE translator K201DX.

Reception to the south across the Oregon border is spotty. This is due to the geography of the region and location of KTCV's tower.

To the north, KTCV reaches approximately 35 miles north of the Tri-Cities along US Highway 395.

The farthest report of KTCV reception has been over a distance of 90 miles from the Tri-Cities at the Sprague Lake rest area along Interstate 90.

Mission

The station operates as a learning tool for the students of the Radio Broadcasting program at the Tri-Tech Skills Center. First year students learn about radio history, radio theory, public speaking, broadcast writing and various live audio applications. First year students also read short newscasts on KTCV.  Second year students take a more active role in KTCV; from day-to-day operations and on-air announcing. These students learn the NEXGEN digital automation in addition to the Selector software, Pro-Tools and Adobe Audition.

Unique to KTCV is the students' influence on the format and programming. KTCV is one of only a few high school stations in the state that the students take an active role in operations, programming and management.

Community Radio Class

In addition to students, an adult community radio class is offered from time to time. This gives adults in the great Tri-City area an opportunity to learn the skills that the high school age students acquire. These class attendees read news and voice track for KTCV in addition to learning radio broadcasting history and theory, news writing and proper announcing techniques. Adults who complete this course are able to submit proposals for their own specialty show on KTCV to Mr. Dailey just like the regular Tri-Tech Radio Broadcasting students.

External links

TCV
High school radio stations in the United States
Radio stations established in 1984